Paul Mentré (1935–2019) was a French politician and businessman.

Biography
Mentré is a graduate of École Polytechnique. He holds a law degree and a DSS in economics. After school, he worked for the Inspection générale des finances. In 1971, he was named as deputy director of the cabinet of Valéry Giscard d'Estaing; he served until 1973. In 1973, he was appointed Director of Crédit national; he served until 1975. He was then financial advisor to the French embassy in Canada and the United States; and administrator of the International Monetary Fund and the World Bank; he served in this role until 1981. In 1986, he served as an advisor to René Thomas, then president of the Banque Nationale de Paris. In 1987, he was named Managing Director and then CEO of Crédit National where he served until 1990. In 1992, he was appointed to the head the board of SICAV Valréal, created in 1982 by Paribas, Groupe Banque Populaire, and the Caisse des Dépôts, succeeding André Battestini. In 1995, he was elected President of the  succeeding Pierre Lepeudry; he served until 2008 when he was replaced by Philippe Augier.

Personal life
He died on January 3, 2020. He had four children: France Mentré, professor of biostatistics, Agnès Mentré-Jacobs, Gilles Mentré, former MD at Lazard Frères and advisor to President Nicolas Sarkozy, and Arnaud Mentré, former Consul General of France in Boston. France Mentré was awarded the Research Prize from Inserm. Agnès Mentre is a former Lazard Frères banker who married Kenneth M. Jacobs and later became a film producer with credits including The Wrestler, the Michael Moore documentary Fahrenheit 9/11, and Wind River.

References

1935 births
2019 deaths
French politicians
French bankers
École Polytechnique alumni